Hillevåg is a borough of the city of Stavanger which lies in the southwestern part of the large municipality of Stavanger in Rogaland county, Norway. It is located southwest of the city centre, south of the lake Mosvatnet, and north of the borough of Hinna. Hillevåg was a part of the old municipality of Hetland until 1965. The borough has residential areas as well as some industrial areas. The University of Stavanger and the Norwegian Petroleum Directorate are located in Hillevåg also. The  borough has a population (2016) of 19,681.

Neighbourhoods
Although the borders of "neighbourhoods" do not correspond exactly to the borough borders, Hillevåg roughly consists of the following neighbourhoods: Ullandhaug, Vaulen, Kvalaberg, Tjensvoll, and Bekkefaret.

Politics
Hillevåg borough is led by a municipal borough council. The council consists of 11 members, with the following party allegiances:

References

Boroughs and neighbourhoods of Stavanger